Eldorado Merkoçi (born 6 January 1978 in Tirana) is an Albanian retired football player. He spent most of his playing career at KF Tirana, making over 200 appearances for the club and scoring a total of 40 goals.

Club career
He had a spell in Austria, playing for SV Wörgl alongside compatriot Auron Miloti in 2000.

International career
He made his debut for Albania in a February 1999 friendly match against Macedonia and earned a total of 2 caps, scoring no goals. His second and final international was an April 2001 friendly match against Turkey.

Honours

Club
KF Tirana

Albanian Superliga (7): 1994–95, 1995–96, 1996–97, 1998–99, 2003–04, 2004–05, 2006–07
Albanian Cup (4): 1995–96, 1998–99, 2001–02, 2005–06
Albanian Supercup (6): 1994, 2002, 2003, 2005, 2006, 2007

References

External links

1978 births
Living people
Footballers from Tirana
Albanian footballers
Association football midfielders
Albania international footballers
KF Tirana players
KF Vllaznia Shkodër players
FK Partizani Tirana players
KF Elbasani players
Kategoria Superiore players
Albanian expatriate footballers
Albanian expatriate sportspeople in Austria
Expatriate footballers in Austria